The Sapotoideae are a subfamily of the flowering plant family Sapotaceae. Plants in the subfamily are characterized by their leather-like leaves, often growing in a stipule fashion.

The seeds of the tree Argania spinosa produce an edible oil, traditionally harvested in Morocco.

Genera
Genera accepted by the Germplasm Resources Information Network as of December 2022:

 Argania Roem. & Schult.
 Autranella A.Chev.
 Baillonella Pierre
 Bemangidia L.Gaut.
 Burckella Pierre
 Capurodendron Aubrév.
 Diploknema Pierre
 Faucherea Lecomte
 Gluema Aubrév. & Pellegr.
 Inhambanella (Engl.) Dubard
 Isonandra Wight
 Labourdonnaisia Bojer
 Labramia A.DC.
 Lecomtedoxa (Pierre ex Engl.) Dubard
 Letestua Lecomte
 Madhuca Ham. ex J.F.Gmel.
 Manilkara Adans.
 Mimusops L.
 Neohemsleya T.D.Penn.
 Neolemonniera Heine
 Nesoluma Baill.
 Northia Hook.f.
 Palaquium Blanco
 Payena A.DC.
 Sideroxylon L.
 Tieghemella Pierre
 Tsebona Capuron
 Vitellaria C.F.Gaertn.
 Vitellariopsis Baill. ex Dubard

References

External links

 
Asterid subfamilies